Ichagarh  Assembly constituency is a assembly constituency in the Indian state of Jharkhand.

Overview
According to the Delimitation of Parliamentary and Assembly Constituencies Order, 2008 of the Election Commission of India, Ichagarh Assembly constituency covers Ichagarh, Chandil and Nimdih police stations. It is an open constituency. Ichagarh Assembly constituency is part of Ranchi (Lok Sabha constituency).

Members of Assembly 

1962: Prabhat Kumar Aditya Deo, Swaraj Party,
1967:Prabhat Kumar Aditya Deo, Indian National Congress,

1972:Shatrughan Aditya Deo, Independent,
1985:Prabhat Kumar Aditya Deo, Indian National Congress,
2005: Sudhir Mahato, Jharkhand Mukti Morcha
2009: Arvind Kumar Singh (Malkhan Singh), Jharkhand Vikas Morcha (Prajatantrik)
2014: Sadhu Charan Mahato, Bharatiya Janata Party
2019: Sabita Mahato, Jharkhand Mukti Morcha

Election Results

2019

See also
Vidhan Sabha
List of constituencies of Jharkhand Legislative Assembly

References

Assembly constituencies of Jharkhand